Ship of Fools is a 1965 American drama film directed by Stanley Kramer, set on board an ocean liner bound to Germany from Mexico in 1933. It stars a prominent ensemble cast of 11 stars — Vivien Leigh (in her final film role), Simone Signoret, Jose Ferrer, Lee Marvin, Oskar Werner, Elizabeth Ashley, George Segal, Jose Greco, Michael Dunn, Charles Korvin and Heinz Ruehmann. It also marked Christiane Schmidtmer's first U.S. production.

Ship of Fools, which was based on Katherine Anne Porter's 1962 novel of the same name, was highly regarded, with reviewers praising the cast's performance but also noted the movie's overlong (for 1965) runtime. The film was nominated for eight Academy Awards in 1966, including for Best Picture, Best Actor for Oskar Werner, Best Actress for Simone Signoret, and Best Supporting Actor for Michael Dunn. It won for Best Art Direction, Black-and-White and Best Cinematography, Black-and-White.

Introductory comments by Michael Dunn
"My name is Carl Glocken and this... is a ship of fools. I'm a fool and you'll meet more fools as we go along... this tub is packed with them. Emancipated ladies... ball players... lovers... dog lovers... ladies of joy... tolerant Jews... dwarfs... all kinds... and who knows... if you look closely enough, you may even find yourself on board."

Plot
The action of the film takes place almost entirely on board a passenger ship in 1933, between Veracruz Mexico and Bremerhaven, Germany. Most of the scenes unfold on the First Class deck or among the upper middle-class passengers, but the ship is carrying 600 displaced workers, far more than the ship is certified to carry and they're assigned to squalid conditions in steerage. They are all being deported back to Spain by the order of the Cuban dictator, Gerardo Machado. Many passengers bound for Nazi Germany are happy, some are apprehensive, while others downplay the significance of fascist politics.

She is being transported to a Spanish prison on the Canary Island of Tenerife. Her sense of doom is contrasted with the doctor's initial determination to fight the forces of oppression, embodied by his insistence that the people in steerage be treated like human beings rather than cargo. The doctor conceals having a heart condition. His sympathy for the countess soon evolves into love, though both realize it is a hopeless passion.

Selected passengers are invited to dine each night at the captain's table. Some are amused and others offended by the anti-Semitic rants of a German businessman named Rieber who – though married – begins an affair with Lizzi. The Jewish Lowenthal is not invited and is seated at a side table with a dwarf named Glocken and the two bond over their sense of social exclusion. Later a passenger named Freytag is shocked to find himself blackballed from the Captain's Table when Rieber learns Freytag's wife is Jewish and after an angry public outburst, he too is re-seated at the side table. Here Lowenthal counsels Glocken regarding tactical accommodation to the Nazis from people like Rieber, stating that Germany has been good for the Jews and the Jews have been good for Germany, "We are Germans first and Jews second...There are nearly a million Jews in Germany. What are they going to do, kill all of us?"

Others aboard include an American couple, David and Jenny. Jenny is infatuated with David, who is disconsolate at his lack of success as a socially committed artist and feels stifled by Jenny's needy dependence. Mary Treadwall, a divorcée, drinks and flirts. She is on a quest to recapture her lost youth while in Paris, but the men who take an interest in her she rejects as unworthy. Bill Tenny is a former baseball player with a drinking problem, angry the way his career never took off. Passengers are entertained nightly by a troupe of flamenco musicians and dancers, whose leader pimps the women in the troupe, while other passengers regularly drink themselves to oblivion. One young heir to a fortune loses his virginity to one of the flamenco dancers, who treats him with gentleness.

The ship arrives in Spain where the displaced workers from steerage disembark.  Here, after an emotionally painful farewell with the doctor,  is forced to exit the ship under Civil Guard escort. Upon arrival in Germany, the remaining passengers depart the ship. The doctor dies before the ship reaches Bremerhaven and his body is unloaded in a coffin. At the disembarkation, which seems like a parade, most characters show they will behave as though it is 'business as usual.'

The last passenger to leave the 'Ship of Fools' is Glocken, who speaks directly to camera, as he did in the opening minutes of the film. Glocken asks the film's audience if they are thinking "What has all this to do with us?" (meaning the passengers). "Nothing" he adds and exits into the crowd.

Cast

 Vivien Leigh as Mary Treadwell     
 Simone Signoret as La Condesa
 Jose Ferrer as Rieber 
 Lee Marvin as Tenny
 Oskar Werner as Dr. Schumann 
 Elizabeth Ashley as Jenny 
 George Segal as David
 Jose Greco as Pepe 
 Michael Dunn as Glocken 
 Charles Korvin as Capt. Thiele 
 Heinz Ruehmann as Lowenthal 
 Lilia Skala as Frau Hutten 
 Barbara Luna as Amparo  
 Christiane Schmidtmer as Lizzi 
 Alf Kjellin as Freytag
 Werner Klemperer as Lt. Huebner
 John Wengraf as Graf
 Olga Fabian as Frau Schmitt
 Gila Golan as Elsa
 Oscar Beregi as Lutz
 Stanley Adams as Hutten
 Karen Verne as Frau Lutz
 Charles de Vries as Johann
 Lydia Torea as Pastora
 Henry Calvin as Fat Man
 Peter Mamakos as Religious Man
 Paul Daniel as Carlos
 David Renard as Woodcarver
 Rudy Carrella as Ric
 Silvia Marino as Rac
 Anthony Brand as Guitarist

Songs
Music by Ernest Gold 
Lyrics by Jack Lloyd
"Heute abend geh'n wir bummeln auf der Reeperbahn" ("Tonight we're going for a stroll on the Reeperbahn")
"Irgendwie, irgendwo, irgendwann" ("Somehow, somewhere, sometime")

Production

Katherine Anne Porter's novel Ship of Fools was published in 1962. The essayist and short story author's only novel was the culmination of a 20-year-long project that was based on her reminiscences of a 1931 ocean cruise she had taken from Veracruz to Germany.

Producer David O. Selznick wanted to purchase the film rights, but United Artists owned the property and demanded $400,000. The novel was adapted for film by Abby Mann. Producer and director Stanley Kramer, who ended up with the film, planned to star Vivien Leigh but was initially unaware of her fragile mental and physical health. The film proved to be her last film and in later recounting her work, Kramer remembered her courage in taking on the difficult role, "She was ill, and the courage to go ahead, the courage to make the film--was almost unbelievable." Leigh's performance was tinged by paranoia and resulted in outbursts that marred her relationship with other actors, although both Simone Signoret and Lee Marvin were sympathetic and understanding. In particular, during one scene shoot,  she hit Lee Marvin so hard with a spiked shoe, that it bruised his face.

At the conclusion of filming, screenwriter Mann reportedly threw a party for almost the entire cast and crew except Gila Golan, whose performance Mann was reputedly not happy with.

Reception
Although well received by audiences, Ship of Fools was looked at by some reviewers as a Grand Hotel (1932) afloat, a film which had often been imitated. "Preachy and melodramatic" was another criticism, although the cast was universally praised.

Bosley Crowther of The New York Times saw the film as much more, "Stanley Kramer has fetched a powerful, ironic film ...  there is such wealth of reflection upon the human condition in Ship of Fools and so subtle an orchestration of the elements of love and hate, achieved through an expert compression of the novel by Mr. Kramer and his script writer, Abby Mann, that it is really not fair to tag it with the label of any previous film. It has its own quiet distinction in the way it illuminates a theme." He also singled out the work of Oskar Werner. In a similar vein, Variety noted, "Director-producer Stanley Kramer and scenarist Abby Mann have distilled the essence of Katherine Anne Porter's bulky novel in a film that appeals to the intellect and the emotions."

The film was banned in Franco's Spain because of its anti-fascist stance.

On Rotten Tomatoes, Ship of Fools holds a rating of 64% from 22 reviews.

Awards and nominations

Vivien Leigh won the L'Étoile de Cristal for her performance in a leading role.

The film is recognized by American Film Institute in these lists:
 2005: AFI's 100 Years of Film Scores – Nominated

Media
The film has been issued on VHS, laserdisc and DVD. The film's standalone DVD release is an open matte 1.33:1 transfer with no supplements. The film was later reissued in widescreen with supplements in a Stanley Kramer box set from Sony Pictures Home Entertainment. Currently, the film is also available in a budget-priced two-disc, four-movie collection DVD licensed from Sony to Mill Creek Entertainment. All four films are presented in their original theatrical aspect ratios and are anamorphically enhanced. The film has been released on Blu-ray in a double feature pack with the film Lilith via Mill Creek.

See also
 List of American films of 1965

References

Notes

Citations

Bibliography

 Andersen, Christopher P. An Affair to Remember: The Remarkable Love Story of Katharine Hepburn and Spencer Tracy. Glasgow, Scotland: William Morrow & Co., 1997. .
 Bean, Kendra. Vivien Leigh: An Intimate Portrait. Philadelphia, Pennsylvania: Running Press, 2013. .
 David, Catherine. Simone Signoret. New York: Overlook Press, 1995. .
 Epstein, Dwayne. Lee Marvin: Point Blank. Tucson, Arizona: Schaffner Press, Inc., 2013. .
 Porter, Katherine Anne. The Collected Stories of Katherine Anne Porter. New York: Harcourt Brace, 1979. .
 Porter, Katherine Anne. Ship of Fools. New York: Back Bay Books, Revised edition 1984. .
 Walker, Alexander. Vivien: The Life of Vivien Leigh. New York: Grove Press, 1987. .

External links
 
 
 
 
 
 Original soundtrack of music from Ship of Fools

1965 films
1960s psychological drama films
American black-and-white films
American psychological drama films
1960s German-language films
1960s Spanish-language films
Columbia Pictures films
Films based on American novels
Films scored by Ernest Gold
Films directed by Stanley Kramer
Films produced by Stanley Kramer
Films set in 1933
Films set on ships
Films whose art director won the Best Art Direction Academy Award
Films whose cinematographer won the Best Cinematography Academy Award
Seafaring films
1965 drama films
1960s English-language films
1960s American films